The Pope's Sister is the second studio album by Irish anti-folk band Music for Dead Birds.

Background and release

The album was recorded by the group's frontman, Jimmy Monaghan, using a 4-track cassette recorder. The lo-fi sound was inspired by the album Sebadoh III.
The album was released on Halloween day, 2011. It was listed by RTE 2fm DJ Dan Hegarty as one of the top 50 Irish albums of 2011. It received mainly positive reviews, with Terrascope writing "By the time you get to “Release the Dogs” you find you are fully immersed in the album, the twisted guitar lines hooking you in with relentless ease." In promotion of the album the group played as an opening act for And So I Watch You From Afar.

Track listing

 "Gretchen Ross" – 1:59
 "The Only male Nun In Town" – 2:12
 "In The Lighthouse" – 2:10
 "Ageing Hippy" – 2:19
 "The Doctor's Daughter" – 2:03
 "The Candlemaker's Sister" – 4:32
 "Drop Skills" – 2:52
 "Release The Dogs"  – 2:09
 "Turn Yourself Inside Out" – 1:54
 "The Electrician's Father" - 3:32

Personnel

Jimmy Monaghan – vocals, guitar, drums

References

External links

The Pope's Sister at Bandcamp

2011 albums
Music for Dead Birds albums